Adedamola Durodola, better known as Mowille, is an Afro-fusion singer and song-writer based in the United Kingdom.

Mowille formally started his career in 2015 and is currently working as an independent artist.

Career
In 2014, he released Pass Out along with DSkillz as a musical video.

In 2020, he released another new song, Get Up Now.

In 2021, he released a new song Dinner along with Damola Davis. In August 2021, he released Ride N Roll.

Discography
Afro Fiesta (2013)
Moti Thirty (2017)
Emi Ekun (2019) 
ODUSTY (2020)
Get Up Now (2020)
Dinner (2021)
Ride N Roll (2021)

References

Living people
Year of birth missing (living people)